The Republic of Adygea (Adıgə Respublik), also known as the Adyghe Republic, is a republic of Russia. It is situated in the North Caucasus of Eastern Europe. It is an enclave within Krasnodar Krai and is the fifth-smallest Russian federal subject by area. Maykop is the capital and the largest city of Adygea, home to one-third of the republic's population.

Adygea is one of Russia's ethnic republics, primarily representing the indigenous Circassian people that form 25% of the Republic's population, while Russians form a majority at 60%, and with minority populations of Armenians and Ukrainians. The official languages of Adygea are Adyghe and Russian.

Geography
Adygea lies in Russia's Southern Federal District of Eastern Europe, in the foothills of the Northwestern Caucasus in the Caucasus Mountains System, with plains in the northern areas and mountains in the southern area. Forests (mainly of European beech, oak, and maple) cover almost 40% of its territory.
Area — .
Borders — the Republic of Adygea is entirely surrounded by Krasnodar Krai.
Highest point — Chugush Mountain: .

Rivers

It forms part of the northern border between the Republic of Adygea and Krasnodar Krai.
Other rivers include:
Belaya River
Chokhrak River
Dakh River
Fars River
Khodz River
Kisha River
Bolshaya Laba River — (forming part of the eastern border between Adygea and Krasnodar Krai)
Psekups River
Pshish River
Sakhray River
Sukhoy Kurdzhips River — flows near the archaeological site at Mezmaiskaya cave.

Lakes

The republic has no large lakes. However, the several large reservoirs include:
Krasnodarskoye Reservoir
Oktyabrskoye Reservoir
Shapsugskoye Reservoir
Tshchitskoye Reservoir

Mountains

Chugush Mountain — 
Mount Fisht — 
Oshten Mountain
Pseashkho Mountain
Shepsi Mountain

Natural resources
The republic is rich in oil and natural gas. Other natural resources include gold, silver, tungsten, and iron.

Climate
Average January temperature: 
Average July temperature: 
Average annual precipitation: 

History

The Cherkess (Adyghe) Autonomous Oblast was established within the Russian SFSR on July 27, 1922, on the territories of the Kuban-Black Sea Oblast, primarily settled by the Adyghe people. At that time, Krasnodar was the administrative center. It was renamed Adyghe (Cherkess) Autonomous Oblast on August 24, 1922, soon after its creation. In the first two years of its existence the autonomous oblast was a part of the Russian SFSR, but on October 17, 1924, it was transferred to the jurisdiction of the newly created North Caucasus Krai within the RSFSR.

It was renamed Adyghe Autonomous Oblast (AO) in July 1928. On January 10, 1934, the autonomous oblast became part of the new Azov-Black Sea Krai, which was removed from North Caucasus Krai. Maykop was made the administrative center of the autonomous oblast in 1936. Adyghe AO became part of Krasnodar Krai when it was established on September 13, 1937.

On July 3, 1991, the oblast was elevated to the status of a republic under the jurisdiction of the Russian Federation. The first President of the republic was Aslan Dzharimov, elected on 5 January 1992.

Relations between the Adyghe and ethnic Russians in Adygea are currently good. Russians make up two-thirds of the population within Adygea. The current Head of Adygea is Murat Kumpilov.

Politics

The chief executive of the government of the Republic of Adygea is the Head (called "President" until May 2011), who is appointed for a five-year term. Proficiency in the Adyghe language is a prerequisite for the candidate.

The current Head, Murat Kumpilov (since January 27, 2017), succeeded Aslan Tkhakushinov, initially as acting Head of the region. There is also a directly elected State Council (Khase or Xase—not to be confused with the Adyghe Khase, a union of Adyghe who supported Sovmen for a second term), which comprises the Council of Representatives and the Council of the Republic. Both councils are elected every five years and have 27 deputies each.

The Republic sends three representatives to the parliament of the Russian Federation; one to the State Duma and the other two to the Federation Council.

The Constitution of the Republic of Adygea was adopted on May 14, 1995.

Divisions

The Republic of Adygea is administratively divided into seven districts (raions), two cities/towns, and (at a lower administrative level) five urban-type settlements. Municipally, the republic is divided into two urban okrugs, five urban settlements, and 46 rural settlements.

 Note "м.р." above is an abbreviation for "муниципальный район" (Municipal District)

Demographics
Population: 

Life expectancy:

Vital statistics
Source: Russian Federal State Statistics Service

Ethnic groups
According to the 2021 Census, ethnic Russians make up 64.4% of the republic's total population, while the ethnic Adyghe are 25.7%. Other groups include Armenians (3.3%), Kurds (1.2%), Romani people (0.7%) and Ukrainians (0.6%).

 50,304 people were registered from administrative databases, and could not declare an ethnicity. It is estimated that the proportion of ethnicities in this group is the same as that of the declared group.
 Including 397 Kabardins and 16,133 Cherkess.

Religions

According to a 2012 survey which interviewed 56,900 people  35.4% of the population of Adygea adheres to the Russian Orthodox Church 23.6% to Islam, 3% are unaffiliated Christians and 1% are Orthodox Christian believers who don't belong to church or are members of other Orthodox churches. In addition, 19.8% of the population declares to be "spiritual but not religious" 8% is atheist, and 8.6% follows other religions or did not answer to the question.

Education
Adyghe State University and Maykop State Technological University, both in the capital Maykop, are the two major higher education facilities in Adygea.

Economy

Even though it is one of the poorest parts of Russia, the republic has abundant forests and rich soil. The region is famous for producing grain, sunflowers, tea, tobacco, and other produce. Hog and sheep breeding are also developed.

Food, timber, woodworking, pulp and paper, heavy engineering, and metal-working are the most developed industries.

Transportation
There is a small airport in Maykop (ICAO airport code URKM). Several rail lines pass through the republic.

Culture

The Adyghe language (Адыгабзэ) is a member of the Northwest Caucasian language family. Along with Russian, Adyghe is the official language of the republic.

There are 8 state and 23 public museums in the republic. The largest museum is the National Museum of the Republic of Adygea in Maykop.

Notable people
Anatoly Berezovoy (1942—2014), Pilot-Cosmonaut of the USSR.
Aslan Dzharimov (born 1936), 1st President of the Republic of Adygea.
Anna Kareyeva (born 1977), handball player.
Mukharby Kirzhinov (born 1949), weightlifter.
Andrei Kobenko (born 1982), footballer.
Nikita Kucherov (born 1993), ice hockey player.
Vladimir Nevzorov (born 1952), judoka.
Hazret Sovmen (born 1937), 2nd President of the Republic of Adygea.
Aslan Tkhakushinov (born 1947), 3rd President of the Republic of Adygea.
Aslan Tlebzu (born 1981), Adyghe folk musician.
Konstantin Vasilyev (1942—1976), painter.

See also
Music in the Republic of Adygea
Mezmaiskaya cave
Circassian genocide
Adyghe people

References

Notes

Sources

External links

Адыгэ Республикэм и Лъэпкъ театр (in Adyghe)
The Voice of Circassians (Adyghe Language)
 Official website of the Republic of Adygea 
Overview of the Republic of Adygea (Kommersant newspaper)
Official Website of the Adyghe State University
 Official Website of the Adyghe State University
 Official Website of the National Museum of the Republic of Adygea

 
Southern Federal District
Enclaves and exclaves
States and territories established in 1991
Russian-speaking countries and territories
Regions of Europe with multiple official languages